Czechoslovakia competed at the 1960 Summer Olympics in Rome, Italy. 116 competitors, 99 men and 17 women, took part in 75 events in 13 sports.

Medalists

Athletics

Basketball

Boxing

Canoeing

Cycling

Six male cyclist represented Czechoslovakia in 1960.

Tandem
 Juraj Miklušica
 Dušan Škvarenina

Team pursuit
 Slavoj Černý
 Ferdinand Duchoň
 Jan Chlístovský
 Josef Volf

Diving

Equestrian

Gymnastics

Rowing

Czechoslovakia had 22 male rowers participate in five of the seven rowing events in 1960.

 Men's double sculls – 1st place ( gold medal)
 Václav Kozák
 Pavel Schmidt

 Men's coxed pair
 Václav Chalupa
 Miroslav Strejček
 František Staněk

 Men's coxless four – 4th place
 Jindřich Blažek
 Miroslav Jíška
 René Líbal
 Jaroslav Starosta

 Men's coxed four
 Pavel Hofmann
 Richard Nový
 Petr Pulkrábek
 Oldřich Tikal
 Miroslav Koníček

 Men's eight – 3rd place ( bronze medal)
 Bohumil Janoušek
 Jan Jindra
 Jiří Lundák
 Stanislav Lusk
 Václav Pavkovič
 Luděk Pojezný
 Jan Švéda
 Josef Věntus
 Miroslav Koníček

Shooting

Nine shooters represented Czechoslovakia in 1960.

25 m pistol
 Jiří Hrneček
 Josef Šváb

50 m pistol
 Vladimír Kudrna
 Jiří Hrneček

300 m rifle, three positions
 Vladimír Stibořík
 František Prokop

50 m rifle, three positions
 Dušan Houdek
 Otakar Hořínek

50 m rifle, prone
 Otakar Hořínek
 Dušan Houdek

Trap
 Josef Hrach
 Václav Zavázal

Swimming

Weightlifting

Wrestling

References

External links
Official Olympic Reports
International Olympic Committee results database
Czech olympic report (in Czech)

Nations at the 1960 Summer Olympics
1960
Summer Olympics